Rear Admiral Derick Henry Fellowes Hetherington CB DSC & Bar (27 June 1911 – 23 November 1992) was a Royal Navy officer who became Flag Officer, Malta.

Early life and education
Hetherington was born on 27 June 1911, and educated at St Neot's School, Eversley and the Royal Naval College, Dartmouth.

In 1942 he married Josephine Mary Vavasour; they had a son and three daughters.

Naval career
Hetherington served in the Second World War becoming commanding officer of the destroyer HMS Windsor in May 1943 and commanding officer of the destroyer HMS Lookout in March 1944. He saw action in the Battle of the Ligurian Sea, destroying two German Ships in March 1945. After the War he was appointed Captain, (D), 4th Destroyer Squadron from March 1956 to November 1957. In July 1959 he was appointed Flag Officer, Malta, retiring from the service in 1961.

Later life and death
After leaving the Royal Navy, Hetherington was appointed as Domestic Bursar of Merton College, Oxford in 1961, and made a Fellow of the college two years later.

In retirement he served as President of the Watlington Branch of the Royal British Legion from 1981 to 1989.

Hetherington died in 1992 and was buried at St Mary's Church in Pyrton in Oxfordshire.

References

Sources

1911 births
1992 deaths
Royal Navy rear admirals
Companions of the Order of the Bath
Recipients of the Distinguished Service Cross (United Kingdom)
Fellows of Merton College, Oxford
Military personnel from Middlesex
Royal Navy personnel of World War II